Pym or PYM may refer to:
 Pym (novel), a novel by Mat Johnson
 Philadelphia  Yearly Meeting, an organizing body for Quaker Meetings
 Pacific Yearly Meeting, an organizing body for Quaker Meetings on the U.S. West Coast
 Plymouth Municipal Airport (Massachusetts)

People
 Anthony Pym, a translation studies scholar
 Arthur Gordon Pym, protagonist of Poe's The Narrative of Arthur Gordon Pym of Nantucket 
 Barbara Pym, a British novelist
 Francis Pym, Baron Pym, UK politician
 Hank Pym (aka Ant Man, Giant Man, Goliath, Yellowjacket and the Wasp), a fictional superhero in the Marvel Universe
 John Pym, 17th century English parliamentarian
 Magnus Pym, a character in the Le Carre novel A Perfect Spy
 Morgan Pym, a character in The Collector

See also 
 Pim (disambiguation)